Osteopeltidae is a taxonomic family of small, deep water sea snails, marine gastropod mollusks in the clade Vetigastropoda (according to the taxonomy of the Gastropoda by Bouchet & Rocroi, 2005).

This family has no subfamilies.

Genera 
Genera within the family Osteopeltidae include:
 Osteopelta Marshall, 1987 - the type genus

References